Mike Downstairs is a 1968 American play. It was poorly reviewed and had a short run on its Broadway debut. The play was also profiled in the William Goldman book The Season: A Candid Look at Broadway.

References

External links

Contemporary review

American plays
1968 plays